Ashland is the name of some places in the U.S. state of New York:
Ashland, Chemung County, New York
Ashland, Greene County, New York